"Give Heaven Some Hell" (stylized in all caps) is a song by American country music singer Hardy. It was released on January 25, 2021, as the second single from his debut studio album A Rock, released in 2020. The song was co-written by Hardy, Ashley Gorley, Ben Johnson and Hunter Phelps, and produced by Joey Moi and Derek Wells.

Content
"Give Heaven Some Hell" is a "stirring" tribute from Hardy to anyone who has lost a loved one. He shared: "'Give Heaven Some Hell' is one of my favorite songs I've ever written, I just hope this helps anyone that's ever suffered a loss of a loved one. Excited for this song to exist in the world."

Music video
The music video was released on July 24, 2020, directed by Justin Clough. It was shot in Lynnville, Tennessee, and uses a rural church funeral for its backdrop, depicting the emotional side of losing someone while also celebrating being close to someone. Hardy co-stars with the song's writers, as well as Jameson Rodgers.

Charts

Weekly charts

Year-end charts

Certifications

References

2021 singles
2021 songs
Hardy (singer) songs
Big Loud singles
Songs written by Ashley Gorley
Songs written by Hardy (singer)
Song recordings produced by Joey Moi
Songs about death